The Closer I Get is the second album by Canadian singer-songwriter Hayden.  It is Hayden's first international release.  In Canada it was released on Hardwood Records/Universal, while in the United States it was released on Outpost Recordings/Geffen/Universal.

The Closer I Get was released on vinyl by Hardwood Records for Record Store Day on April 19, 2014.  At that time, It was the only studio album to have never been released on vinyl.

Track listing
All songs written by Paul Hayden Desser.
 "The Closer I Get" – 3:45
 "Stride" – 2:46
 "The Hazards of Sitting Beneath Palm Trees" – 2:44
 "Bullet" – 5:09
 "Waiting for a Chance to See Her" – 2:41
 "Two Doors" – 5:11
 "Between Us to Hold" – 2:07
 "Better Off Inside" – 3:02
 "Instrumental with Mellotron" – 2:23
 "Memphis" – 3:37
 "Nights Like These" – 2:48
 "You Are All I Have" – 5:40
 "I'll Tell Him Tonight" – 3:41

Notes 

Hayden (musician) albums
1998 albums
Albums produced by John Hanlon